Oakley Hall (1920–2008) was an American novelist.

Oakley Hall may also refer to:

People
 Oakley Hall III (1950–2011), American playwright
 Oakley Hall (band), an American folk rock band

Buildings
 Oakley Hall, Staffordshire, a historic building in Mucklestone, Staffordshire, England
 Oakley Hall, Hampshire
 Great Oakley Hall, a historic building in Great Oakley, Northamptonshire, England

See also
 A. Oakey Hall (1826–1898), mayor of New York City, 1869–1872

Architectural disambiguation pages